Mzwandile Wanky Stick (born 5 October 1984 in Port Elizabeth) is a South African former rugby union footballer, and currently (since 2016) the backline coach for the South African national rugby union team.

Playing career
He captained the South Africa sevens team during the 2008–09 IRB Sevens World Series, which saw the team win the series title for the first time. His favoured position was full-back. He came off the bench for a Southern Kings XV against British & Irish Lions during the 2009 tour to South Africa.

He was named in the  wider training squad for the 2013 Super Rugby season, but was subsequently released to the Vodacom Cup squad.

Coaching
He was named the Under-21 Assistant Coach in 2013. He became the head coach of the  team and their Vodacom Cup team for 2014 and 2015, guiding the Under-19s to their first ever Under-19 Provincial Championship title in 2015.

In December 2015, he was appointed as the backline coach of the  team for the 2016 Super Rugby season,
and joined the South Africa national rugby union team in the same capacity in April 2016.

References

External links
 
 Eastern Province Kings on Suparugby.co.za

1984 births
Living people
Sportspeople from Port Elizabeth
South African rugby union coaches
South African rugby union players
Eastern Province Elephants players
South Africa international rugby sevens players
Rugby sevens players at the 2006 Commonwealth Games
Commonwealth Games rugby sevens players of South Africa